Dickie-roi is a 1981 French miniseries.

Cast

 Dave as Dickie-Roi
 Erick Desmarestz as Roger Jannequin
 Louison Roblin as Janine
 Catherine Jacob as Anne-Marie
 Jean Benguigui as Alex
 Bernard Bauronne as M. Maurice
 Pierre Belot as M. Guérin
 Anne-Marie Jabraud as Mme Guérin
 Yves Bureau as Vanhof
 Liliane Coutanceau as Lucette
 Pauline Delfau as Pauline
 Luc Etienne as Martial
 Patrick Guillaumes as Jean-Pierre
 Marine Jolivet as Adeline
 Yves Marchand as Claude Wahl
 Renaud Marx as Dirk
 Nathalie Mazeas as Thérèse
 Jacqueline Rouillard as Elsa
 André Falcon as Simon Véry
 Marion Game as Marie Lou
 Hugues Quester as Dan
 René Morard as Serge
 Axelle Abbadie as Christine
 Gérard Caillaud as Father Paul
 Alain David as Jo
 Mireille Delcroix as Colette
 André Landais as François
 Michel Beaune as M. Hollmann
 André Reybaz as The Count of Sain
 Victor Garrivier as Pierre Lefèvre
 Louis Lyonnet as Attilio Faraggi
 Jacques Alric as Jean-Marie Lomelin
 André Chanal as Hubert Agnel
 Joseph Falcucci as The barman

Production
This miniseries is based on the novel written by Françoise Mallet-Joris.

References

External links
 

1980s French television miniseries
1980s French television series
1981 French television series debuts
1981 French television series endings